Steptoe and Son in Murder at Oil Drum Lane is a play written by Ray Galton and John Antrobus that brought the Steptoe and Son saga to an end. It was first performed in 2005.

The title of this play was inspired by the Swedish 1982 play Albert & Herbert: Mordet på Skolgatan 15 (meaning Albert & Harold : The Murder at Skolgatan 15) by Sten-Åke Cederhök, although in that play, the murder refers not to Albert, but to their home in Haga, Gothenburg.

Background
Steptoe and Son had been a successful British sitcom in the 1960s and 1970s. Ray Galton had been one of the two writers of the original series, and he co-wrote this play. It brought an end to the Steptoe and Son saga, explaining the two protagonists' lives together and their deaths.

Plot
The year is 2005. Steptoe's old house is now the property of the National Trust. Harold Steptoe, now in his 70s, visits the place, but gets shut in after closing time. Through his monologue, the audience discovers that he eventually killed his father by throwing a spear at him when he was sitting on the toilet. Since then, he has been living in secret in Rio de Janeiro.

While pondering his old home, the ghost of his father, Albert, reappears. Albert explains that he has been trapped in this house with the "poncy" National Trust man, and that the only thing that Albert needs to get into heaven is an apology from Harold.  Harold refuses to give it, though, because he blames Albert for ruining his life.

Most of the story is told in flashback. Albert refused to let him go to school, forcing him into a life of no education. Albert forced Harold to take the blame for looting in the Blitz. Albert then stopped him from going to the D-Day landings. Albert had locked him in a secret compartment throughout the war. When the war ends, Harold is arrested and sent to fight in the Malayas. When he returns, Albert continues to ruin his life. In an attempt to be rid of Albert forever, Harold plans to emigrate to New Zealand with his fiancée, Joyce. Albert ruins it by telling them that Joyce is secretly Harold's sister. Harold sets off for New Zealand, but Albert gets him arrested by framing him as a thief. When Harold gets out of jail, Albert thwarts all his attempts to get a girlfriend. Harold is absolutely mad at Albert until he discovers that in all the junk, he has a copy of the Gutenberg Bible, worth £3 million. Harold is over the moon and runs off to celebrate. Albert is not so happy, realising that his simple life with Harold will be over. In the next scene, Harold returns home to find the Bible missing, and presumes his father has destroyed it. In a fit of rage, he throws a spear at the toilet door. At that moment, Albert opens the door and is stabbed by the spear.

The flashbacks end. Harold finds it in his heart to forgive Albert. Then, he has a heart attack (due to finding the Bible was hidden for safe measures, not destroyed, yet over time it had been chewed and ripped) and becomes a ghost along with Albert. The next morning, his body is discovered, and Joyce, who has become a nun, asks for him to be buried next to his father, much to Harold's annoyance. Albert accidentally tells Harold that Joyce and he are not really related. Harold is furious, and in the argument, they fly into the sky on their old wagon, pulled by their old horse Hercules, arguing over which one will go to Heaven.

Actors
 Harold – Jake Nightingale
 Albert – Harry Dickman
 National Trust Man, Policeman No. 1, Military Policeman – Daniel Beales
 Pamela Joyce – Alyson Coote
 Fiona – Louise Metcalfe
 Policeman No. 2 – Andy Clarkson

Production credits
 Director – Roger Smith
 Designer – Nigel Hook
 Lighting designer – Tony Simpson
 Composer – Christopher Madin
 Sound designer – Clement Rawling
 General manager – Armand Gerrard
 Production manager – Dominic Fraser

External links
 Comedy Theatre Guide
 Guardian Review
 VisitLondon Guide 

2005 plays
English plays
Steptoe and Son